The Adrianov compass is a military compass designed by Russian Imperial Army topographist Vladimir Adrianov in 1907. Wrist-worn versions of the compass were then adopted and widely used by the Red and Soviet Army. Some of the older production examples (differentiated by the brownish color of their glow-in-the-dark markings, like the one in the photo) are slightly radioactive because of Radium-226 used in their dials. Newer ones, with teal or white paint color, use the non-radioactive phosphorescent paint.

References 

Travel gear
Navigational equipment
Military equipment of Russia